Going Deaf for a Living is a 1980 album by Fischer-Z. This was the second album by Fischer-Z featuring the "classic line-up". The guitar on this album was made more prominent, after their rather keyboard prominent debut. This album, as well the following Red Skies Over Paradise, are considered by fans as the best work to be produced by Fischer-Z. The album featured the singles "Room Service", "Crazy Girl", "Limbo" and the most popular "So Long", which hit #72 in the UK singles chart, #15 in Australia and #26 in the Netherlands.

"So Long" was the first single by Fischer-Z to have a video made for it, and still garners regular airplay on radio stations in Europe,
and Australia.

Track listing
All songs written by John Watts
"Room Service"
"So Long"
"Crazy Girl"
"No Right"
"Going Deaf For A Living"
"Pick Up/Slip Up"
"Crank"
"Haters"
"Four Minutes in Durham (With You)"
"Limbo"

Charts

Personnel
Fischer-Z
John Watts - lead vocals, guitar
Steve Skolnik - keyboards
David Graham - bass
Steve Liddle - drums
Technical
Richard Manwaring - engineer
John Pasche - sleeve, art direction, design
Phil Jude - cover photography

References

1980 albums
Fischer-Z albums
Albums produced by Mike Howlett
United Artists Records albums